Lauderdale Football Club is an Australian rules football club based in the Hobart, beachside suburb of Lauderdale.

History
The Lauderdale Football Club was formed in 1948 and were known as the Lauderdale Cats until 2004 when Australian Football League team Essendon Bombers aligned with Lauderdale, changing the club's name to the Lauderdale Bombers.

The club was a founding member of the Southern Tasmanian Football League in 1996 after being a member of other various leagues, such as the Tasman Football Association (1979–80), and was a member of the Tasmanian Amateur Football League (Southern Division) prior to 1996. The club won the 1991 Southern Amateur premiership and were runners up in 1993.

The Southern Tasmanian Football league changed its name in 1998 to the Southern Football League. In the years between 1996 and 2001, Lauderdale had little success and struggled with a success rate of just 30.2%. In 2002, the league was split into two divisions and Lauderdale was placed into the Regional League. The club finally had some success, making the Grand Final in both 2002 and 2003. Although beaten by Cygnet in both of the club's finals campaigns. 2003 also marked the start to Arnoldus Matthews’ senior career and proved to be one of the most successful swing men in the clubs history able to play at either end of the ground to great success. it was successful in its application to join the SFL Premier League after Sorell Football Club was forced into recess for a season and later rejoined the competition, this time in the Regional League. The Essendon alignment coincided with the clubs entry into the Southern Football League's Premier League and the club started the 2004 season as the Lauderdale Bombers. After disappointing campaigns in 2004, 2005 and 2006 the Bombers finally started to make inroads into the competition in 2007, missing the final five by only 12% from the Hobart Lions and collected some impressive scalps along the way, beating both Clarence and North Hobart during the roster season and finished fourth in 2008 finals series. With the Lauderdale under-17s team breaking through for its maiden premiership victory in the SFL Premier League against North Hobart, a strong future seems to be building. Lauderdale was included as a member of AFL Tasmania's new Tasmanian State League competition in 2009, despite being competitive the senior team eventually finished 9th, the reserves team were also strongly competitive and the Under-19's went on to win the premiership during an undefeated season and beating Clarence in the grand final.

Identity

Guernsey and colours

This is the current 2009 jumper design. From 2009 a clash jumper was introduced to be worn against the North Launceston Bombers.

The Lauderdale Football Club were originally known as the Cats and wore a blue and white hooped jumper until becoming the Bombers in 2005. The current clash jumper is a homage to the clubs historical colours and moniker.

Club song
The Club's theme song is the same as Essendon's theme song and is named "See the Bombers Fly Up" and is based on the tune of Johnnie Hamp's 1929 song "Keep Your Sunny Side Up" at an increased tempo. The lyrics are as follows:

See the Bombers fly up, up!
To win the premiership flag.
Our boys who play this grand old game,
Are always striving for glory and fame!
See the Bombers fly up, up,
The other teams they don't fear,
They all try their best,
But they can't get near,
As the Bombers fly up!

Club records

STFL/SFL Regional League runners-up
2002, 2003

State premierships
Nil

Walter Howard Medallists
1994 – L. Franklin

Peter Hodgman Medallists:
2002 – B. Marsland

William Leitch Medallists:
Nil

Club record games holder:
Matthew Coulson – 464 games

Club record attendance:
Not available

Club Record Score:
Not Available

The club

Home ground:
Lauderdale Oval – 1948–present
Bellerive Oval – 2005–present

Colours:
Red and black (formerly navy blue and white)

Emblem:
Bombers (formerly Cats)

Notable former/current players
Tom Collier
Mitch Robinson
Jacob Gillbee
Andrew Phillips
 Matt McGuinness
 Josh McGuinness
 Paul Hudson II
Allen Christensen
 Arnoldus Matthews

Sponsors
Major sponsor: – Dowling McCarthy Tyreright
 Oceana Health and Fitness Centre
 Foreshore Tavern (EBC Lesuire)
 K & D Mitre 10
Harmony garden centre
James Boags
Giffards Floor World 
Pura Milk
Farmers Union Iced Coffee
MG Roberst Plumbing

References

External links
Official website
Lauderdale Bombers – Australian Football National website

Australian rules football clubs in Tasmania
1948 establishments in Australia
Australian rules football clubs established in 1948
Tasmanian Football League clubs